The Mir Castle Complex (romanized: Mirski zamak) is historic fortified castle and a UNESCO World Heritage Site in Belarus. Erected in the 16th century in the late Brick Gothic style, it is one of the few remaining architectural monuments of the former Polish–Lithuanian Commonwealth in contemporary Belarus.

History

Duke Juryj Ivanavič Illinič (:pl:Jerzy Iwanowicz Ilinicz) began construction of the castle near the village of Mir after the turn of the 16th century in the Belarusian Gothic style. In 1568, when the Ilyinich dynasty died out, the Mir Castle passed into the hands of Mikalaj Kryštafor "the Orphan" Radziwil, who refitted it with a two-winged, three-story stately residence along the eastern and northern inner walls of the castle. Plastered facades were decorated with limestone portals, plates, balconies and porches in the Renaissance style.

In 1817, after the castle had been abandoned for nearly a century and had suffered severe damage in the Battle of Mir (1812), owner Daminik Hieranim Radziwil died of battle injuries and the castle passed to his daughter Stefania, who married Ludwig zu Sayn-Wittgenstein-Berleburg.  Later the castle became a possession of their daughter Maria, who married Prince Chlodwig Hohenlohe-Schillingsfürst.

Their son, Maurice Hohenlohe-Schillingsfürst, sold the castle to Mikalaj Sviatapolk-Mirski, of the Bialynia clan, in 1895. Mikalaj's son Michail began to rebuild the castle according to the plans of architect Teodor Bursche. The Sviatapolk-Mirski family owned the castle until 1939, when the Soviet Union occupied Western Belarus.

When German forces invaded the Soviet Union in 1941, they occupied the castle and converted it to a ghetto for the local Jewish population, prior to their murders. Between 1944 and 1956, the castle was used as a housing facility, resulting in damage to the castle's interior.

In December 2000, the Mir Castle was listed by UNESCO as a World Heritage Site.

Related World Heritage Sites
Niaśviž Castle
Litomyšl Castle

Gallery

References

External links

 Mir Castle Official Website
 Mir Castle on official website of the Republic of Belarus
Castle in Mir
Official UNESCO site
The Mir Castle
Photos on Radzima.org
 Jurkau kutoczak — Юркаў куточак — Yury's Corner. Старажытнае дойлідства Міра
Photos on Globus.tut.by
Mir Castle on 3D F4 Map

Castles in Belarus
Castles and palaces of the Radziwiłł family
Brick Gothic
Gothic architecture in Belarus
Buildings and structures in Grodno Region
Karelichy District
Tourist attractions in Grodno Region
Castles of the Grand Duchy of Lithuania
World Heritage Sites in Belarus